Terningskarvet Mountain is a large complex mountain just east of Mayr Ridge, forming the southeast portion of the Gjelsvik Mountains in Queen Maud Land. Mapped by Norwegian cartographers from surveys and air photos by Norwegian-British-Swedish Antarctic Expedition (NBSAE) (1949–52) and by Norwegian Antarctic Expedition (1958–59) and named Terningskarvet (the die mountain).

Mountains of Queen Maud Land
Princess Martha Coast